is a Japanese television drama series premiered on Fuji TV from July 20, 2015 on Mondays at 21:00. It was directed by Hiro Kanai and Shōgo Miyaki, both of whom directed Summer Nude in 2013. The screenplay was written by Sayaka Kuwamura who is a screenwriter of the live-action version of Strobe Edge.

Sota Fukushi played the lead role for the first time in getsuku drama, Tsubasa Honda played his childhood friend, and Shūhei Nomura played his rival in love. They made a joint appearance in Enoshima Prism in 2013.

The first episode received a viewership rating of 9.8%, and the third episode recorded the highest rating of 11.9% in the Kantō region. The last episode was partially broadcast live, and Rino Sashihara appeared as a guest role.

Cast
 Sota Fukushi as Aoi Miura, main character
 Tsubasa Honda as Akari Serizawa, Miura's childhood friend
 Shūhei Nomura as Shōta Aoi, Miura's childhood friend
 Taiga Nakano as Kōhei Kanazawa, Miura's childhood friend
 Sakurako Ohara as Nanami Miura, Aoi Miura's younger sister
 Yui Ichikawa as Ruiko Saeki, Miura's ex-girlfriend
 Yua Shinkawa as Kazuha Sawada, Shōta Aoi's co-worker
 Mizuki Yamamoto as Mirei Tominaga, senior worker at Miura's company
 Yō Yoshida as Mariko Niwa, chairman of Miura's company
 Kaoru Kobayashi as Hirotoshi Serizawa, Akari's father

Episodes

International broadcast
 In Sri Lanka, it was aired on TV Derana with Sinhalese subtitles under the title, Best Friends in Love and premiered on June 7, 2018.

References

External links
  
 

Japanese drama television series
2015 Japanese television series debuts
2015 Japanese television series endings
Fuji TV dramas
Television shows set in Toyama Prefecture